The 1999 Duke Blue Devils football team represented the Duke University in the 1999 NCAA Division I-A football season. The team participated as members of the Atlantic Coast Conference. They played their homes games at Wallace Wade Stadium in Durham, North Carolina. The team was led by head coach Carl Franks.

Schedule

Roster

Team players in the NFL

References

Duke
Duke Blue Devils football seasons
Duke Blue Devils football